Mario Pugliese (born 26 March 1996) is an Italian footballer who plays as a central midfielder or right winger for the six-tier Promozione club Arona.

Club career
Born in San Giorgio a Cremano, Pugliese began his career on Atalanta's youth categories, and was promoted to main squad for 2013–14 season, receiving the no. 96 jersey.

On 4 December 2013 Pugliese made his professional debut, starting in a 2-0 home win over Sassuolo, for the campaign's Coppa Italia.

On 29 January 2015 Pugliese was loaned out to Serie B side Carpi, where he would make 2 appearances for the Biancorossi in their title winning season.

On 25 August 2015 Pugliese was loaned out to Lega Pro side Arezzo.

On 5 August 2016 Atalanta loaned out Pugliese to Pro Piacenza to play in the 2016-17 Lega Pro.

On 6 July 2017 Pugliese was loaned out to Serie B side Pro Vercelli.

On 31 January 2019 he joined Cavese on loan.

On 6 August 2019 he signed a 1-year contract with Vibonese.

International career
With the U-17 Italian national he played the European Championship where Italy placed 2nd, he also play the world cup u-17 in UAE.

References

External links
FIGC stats 

1996 births
People from San Giorgio a Cremano
Footballers from Campania
Living people
Italian footballers
Italy youth international footballers
Association football wingers
Atalanta B.C. players
A.C. Carpi players
S.S. Arezzo players
F.C. Pro Vercelli 1892 players
Carrarese Calcio players
Cavese 1919 players
U.S. Vibonese Calcio players
Novara F.C. players
Casale F.B.C. players
Serie B players
Serie C players
Serie D players
Promozione players